Loknayak is a 2004 biographical film based on the life of Jayaprakash Narayan. It was directed by Prakash Jha. Chetan Pandit played the role of Jayaprakash Narayan and Tisca Chopra played role of Prabhavati Devi, wife of JP Narayan.

Cast
 Chetan Pandit as Jayaprakash Narayan
 Tisca Chopra as Prabhavati Devi
 Tom Alter as Abul Kalam Azad
 Gyan Dev Singh as Vinoba Bhave
 Ashok Chauhan as Mahatma Gandhi
 Meenakshi Thakur as Kasturba
 Ashok Banthia as Ram Manohar Lohia 
 Atul Srivastava as Lal Bahadur Shastri

Filming
Loknayak was shot in Hazaribag, Patna, Sitab Diara, Chhapra (birthplace of JP), Mumbai and Satara. Prakash Jha made the story on the basis of in-depth research along with interviews of eminent personalities like Sachchidananda Sinha, Chandra Shekhar, Atal Bihari Vajpayee, L. K. Advani and Bimal Prasad.

Prakash Jha shot a scene in Jayaprakash Narayan Central Jail (earlier named Hazaribagh Central jail) to re-create the incident when JP, with Shaligram Singh, Suraj Nayaran Singh, Ramanandan Mishra, Yogendra Shukla and Gulab Chand Gupta (Gulabi Sonar) escaped from the jail on 9 November 1942.

References

Memorials to Jayaprakash Narayan
2000s Hindi-language films
2004 films
Films directed by Prakash Jha
Films set in Bihar
Films shot in Bihar
Indian biographical films
2000s biographical films